The 1979 Eastern Illinois Panthers football team represented Eastern Illinois University during the 1979 NCAA Division II football season, and completed the 78th season of Panther football. The Panthers played their home games at O'Brien Stadium in Charleston, Illinois.

Schedule

References 

Eastern Illinois
Eastern Illinois Panthers football seasons
Eastern Illinois Panthers football